Hüseyin Özkan, née Huseyn Delimbekovich Bisultanov (born January 20, 1972), is a Turkish judoka. At the 2000 Summer Olympics held in Sydney, Australia, he won the gold medal in the men's Half Lightweight (60–66 kg) category. He became so the first sportsman to win an Olympics gold medal for Turkey in judo. He is member of the İstanbul Büyükşehir Belediyesi S.K.

He was born in Chechnya, in the North Caucasus of the former USSR, and grew up with his 9 siblings. He began judo in his hometown and continued in Turkey, where he moved at the age of 20.

Achievements
 1993 European Judo Championships - 
 1997 European Judo Championships - 
 1997 Mediterranean Games - 
 1999 European Judo Championships - 
 1999 World Judo Championships - 
 2000 Summer Olympics - 
 2002 European Judo Championships - 7th
 2003 European Judo Championships - 
 2003 World Judo Championships - 7th
 2005 European Judo Championships - 7th

References

External links
 
 
 
 
 Newspaper Milliyet 

1972 births
Living people
Naturalized citizens of Turkey
Turkish people of Chechen descent
Turkish male judoka
Olympic judoka of Turkey
Olympic gold medalists for Turkey
Judoka at the 2000 Summer Olympics
Olympic medalists in judo
Chechen martial artists
Chechen sportsmen
European champions for Turkey
Medalists at the 2000 Summer Olympics
Mediterranean Games gold medalists for Turkey
Competitors at the 1997 Mediterranean Games
Mediterranean Games medalists in judo